21 Signal Regiment is a signal regiment of the Royal Corps of Signals within the British Army.  The regiment was, until the initial Army 2020 reforms, the only signal regiment to support the Royal Air Force. It has recently reformed as the Army's second Electronic Warfare Regiment, since 01st September 2023.

History 
The regiment can trace its roots to the 12th (Air Formations) Signals formed in 1943. Each Royal Air Force group was assigned an Air Formation Regiment to the 21st Army Group.

The regiment was divided into two companies in 1944 upon moving into France, namely:
 2nd Tactical Air Force Main Company
 2nd Tactical Air Force Reserve Company

At the end of the Second World War, the regiment's two companies were stationed at Bad Eilsen and Bueckeburg in Western Germany.

From 1952 to 1954 the squadron supported the West Germany-based No. 83 Group RAF.  In 1959, the 11th Air Formation Support and 12th Air Formation Support Signals Regiment were hurriedly deployed to the Far East but were disbanded in 1971 upon returning to Germany.  As a result of their disbandments, 21st Signal regiment was the only remaining air formation signals regiment.

From 1971 until 1992 the regiment was part of the 4th Signal Group supporting the British Army of the Rhine.  After the Options for Change plan, the regiment was re-designated as 21st Signal Regiment (Air Support) and moved to Colerne where it remains presently.  

During the 2003 Invasion of Iraq, the regiment provided communication support for the Joint Helicopter Command (which consisted of 27 Puma and Chinook helicopters, as well as around 1,100 personnel).

After the initial Army 2020 reforms, the regiment was assigned as part of 7th Signal Group within 11th Signal Brigade and Headquarters West Midlands.  The 21st Signals regiment is classified as a "Multi-Role" signal regiment. As part of the initial Army 2020 reforms, the regiment also was no longer designated as an air support signal regiment and 244 (now carrying the Air Support designation) and 214 signals squadrons were transferred to 30th Signal Regiment and 2nd Signal Regiment respectively. Following further changes under Army 2020 Refine, from 2018 to 2022 the regiment has supported 1(Armoured Infantry) Brigade in developing the STRIKE concept.  As announced in late 2021 under the Army's Future Soldier programme, the regiment will re-role to become the Army's second dedicated Electronic Warfare and Signals Intelligence (EWSI) unit.

Current organisation 
The current organisation of the regiment is (with roles):

 Regimental Headquarters, at Azimghur Barracks, Colerne
 234 Signal Squadron
 Support Squadron

References

External links 
21 Signal Regiment

Regiments of the Royal Corps of Signals
Military units and formations established in 1943